The 2014 Big East women's basketball tournament, officially known as the 2014 Big East championship, was the 35th overall edition of the Big East women's basketball tournament, but the first of the current Big East Conference. It determined the recipient of the conference's automatic bid to the 2014 NCAA tournament.

The 2013 tournament was the last tournament for the Big East in its original form. Following a prolonged period of turnover in the conference membership, culminating in a split of the conference along football lines effective in July 2013, the Big East name was assumed by the seven schools of the original Big East that do not sponsor FBS football (a group colloquially called either the "Basketball 7" or the "Catholic 7"). The new Big East tournament was hosted by DePaul University, with the First round taking place on the school's Chicago campus at McGrath-Phillips Arena while the quarterfinals through the finals took place at Allstate Arena in suburban Rosemont. The semifinals and the championship aired nationwide on Fox Sports 1. The FBS schools of the old Big East retained the original conference structure with a new name, American Athletic Conference.

Seeds

Schedule

Bracket

References

External links
Big East website

Big East women's basketball tournament